Lena Düpont (born 30 April 1986) is a German politician of the Christian Democratic Union who has been serving as a Member of the European Parliament since 2019.

Education and early career
Düpont studied political science and journalism at the University of Erlangen–Nuremberg. As a legislative advisor, she worked, among others, for Renate Sommer in Brussels and then for Ewa Klamt, Eckhard Pols and Ingrid Pahlmann in Berlin.

Member of the European Parliament
Düpont has been a Member of the European Parliament since the 2019 European elections. She has since been serving on the Committee on Civil Liberties, Justice and Home Affairs. In this capacity, she has been the parliament's rapporteur on a 2020 law establishing a common border procedure for international protection. In 2021, she also joined the parliament's working group on Frontex, led by Roberta Metsola. 

In addition to her committee assignments, Düpont is part of the Parliament's delegation to the EU-Montenegro Stabilisation and Association Parliamentary Committee.

Since 2021, Düpont has been serving as deputy chairwoman of the CDU in Lower Saxony, under the leadership of chairman Bernd Althusmann. She was nominated by her party as delegate to the Federal Convention for the purpose of electing the President of Germany in 2022.

Other activities
 Quadriga Hochschule Berlin, Member of the Advisory Board on Politics and Public Affairs

References

1986 births
Living people
MEPs for Germany 2019–2024
21st-century women MEPs for Germany
Christian Democratic Union of Germany MEPs